Sir Andrew George Ritchie (born 4 April 1960) is a British High Court judge.

Early life and education 
Ritchie grew up in Dulwich, London. He attended Magdalene College, Cambridge and graduated with a BA in law in 1981.

Career 
He was first admitted as a solicitor in 1984 and then was called to the bar at the Inner Temple in 1985, practising personal injury and clinical negligence from 9 Gough Chambers; he was head of chambers from 2012 to 2019.  

He took silk in 2009. He was on the executive committee of the Association of Personal Injury Lawyers from 1996 to 1999 and chair of the Personal Injury Bar Association from 2014 to 2016. He served as the College Advocate for Magdalene College, Cambridge. As a practitioner, he appeared before both the Court of Appeal and the House of Lords. In addition to practice, he was general editor of Kemp & Kemp: Law Practice and Procedure from 2005 and he served on the editorial board of Kemp & Kemp on Quantum from 2004 to 2018.

High Court appointment 
On 1 October 2021, Ritchie was appointed a judge of the High Court and assigned to the Queen's Bench Division. He received the customary knighthood the following year.

Personal life 
In 1988, he married Victoria Wilberforce and they had a son and a daughter; they divorced in 2010. In 2012, he married Charlotte Chaliha and they have a daughter.

References 

Living people
1960 births
21st-century English judges
Knights Bachelor
Alumni of Magdalene College, Cambridge
Members of the Inner Temple
Queen's Bench Division judges
English solicitors
English King's Counsel
21st-century King's Counsel